The IULM University - Milan is a university located in Milan, Italy. It was founded in 1968 and is organized in four faculties. 

.

History and profile
The University Institute for Modern Languages (IULM) was founded by Carlo Bo, poet, literary critic and professor of Spanish and French language and literature and Silvio Baridon, French language and literature professor at Bocconi University, in 1968. It was renamed in 1998, as the IULM University of Languages and Communication, to reflect its teaching of both languages and communication. 

IULM University offers six three-year degree courses: 
Interpreting and Communication
Corporate Communication and Public Relations
Communication, Media and Advertising
Tourism, Management and Territory
Arts, Media, Cultural Events
Fashion and Creative Industries

In addition to these three-year undergraduate degree courses, IULM University offers one- and two-year post-graduate degree courses, and also research doctorate schools.

Teaching staff include managers and professionals from media and communication, professional services, business, public administration and cultural organisations. Teaching is done through lectures, classroom activities and case studies, continuous assessment, internships in Italy and abroad and through international student exchanges.

Campus

IULM University campus includes a study centre with modern teaching facilities.

The main building houses a reception desk, students’ admin. offices, the Dean’s office, the library and classrooms. New buildings have recently been added: a canteen catering for about 400 people, a building intended to become a research institute, an auditorium and a hall of residence.

Organization
These are the 3 faculties in which the university is divided into:

 Faculty of Communication
 Faculty of Interpreting and Translation
 Faculty of Arts and Tourism

Bachelor Programs
 Interpreting and Communication
 Corporate Communication and Public Relations
 Communication, Media and Advertising
 Tourism, Management and Territory
 Arts, Media, Cultural Events
 Fashion and Creative Industries

Master's Degree Courses
 Specialised Translation and Conference Interpreting
 Marketing, Consumption and Communication
 Strategic Communication
 Artificial Intelligence for Business and Society
 Television, Cinema and New Media
 Hospitality and Tourism Management
 Arts, Valorisation and Markets

University Master's Degree

Specialist Master's Degree

Master's Executive

Executive Course

Research doctorates
 Visual and Media Studies
 Communication, Markets and Society

See also
 List of Italian universities

External links
 IULM University - Milan Website 

 
Educational institutions established in 1968
1968 establishments in Italy
Universities in Milan